The NIS code (Dutch: NIS-code, French: code INS) is a numeric code for regional areas of Belgium.

This code is used for statistical data treatment in Belgium.
This code was developed mid-1960s by the Statistics Belgium. It was first used for the census of 1970.

Structure of the code 
The NIS code consists of 5 digits:
 The first number identifies the province. if this digit is followed by 4 zeroes, this code identifies the complete province. Example: 70000 identifies the province Limburg.
 The second digit identifies the arrondissement within this province. If after the two first digits there are three zeroes, then this code identifies the complete arrondissement. Example: 71000 identifies the arrondissement of Hasselt.
 The last three digits uniquely identify the municipality within that arrondissement. Example: 71066 identifies Zonhoven.

Special cases
 The country Belgium received the code 01000.
 The three regions received the codes 02000 for Flanders, 03000 for Wallonia and 04000 for the Brussels region.
 In 1995 the province of Brabant with first digit 2 was split in Flemish Brabant and Walloon Brabant. Flemish Brabant received code 20001 and Walloon Brabant received code 20002. The arrondissements kept their old codes.
 The provinces and municipalities of Brussels are sorted alphabetically on their French name.

Mergers 
 municipalities that were merged and received a new name also received a new NIS code, which followed the last number of the list of municipalities of that arrondissement.
 municipalities that lost their independence by merger and became municipality parts, also lost their NIS code. Per merged municipality only 1 NIS code remained. At the same time the structure of the NIS sector was adapted. An alphabetic letter was added per municipality part to be able to uniquely identify such a municipality part.
 The Arrondissement of Brussels-Periphery with code 22000 merging in 1971 with the arrondissement of Halle-Vilvoorde, also lost its code by merger. The municipalities within this arrondissement received a new NIS code.

Examples 
40000: Province East Flanders
 4 Province East Flanders
 0000 This code identifies the complete province

32000: Arrondissement of Diksmuide
 3 Province West Flanders
 2 Arrondissement of Diksmuide
 000 This code identifies the complete arrondissement

73032: municipality Hoeselt
 7 Province Limburg
 3 Arrondissement of Tongeren
 032 municipality Hoeselt

61012: municipality Clavier
 6 Province Liège
 1 Arrondissement of Huy
 012 municipality Clavier

23105: municipality Affligem
 23 Arrondissement of Halle-Vilvoorde
 105 municipality Affligem (new name of this municipality, resulting in the number no longer corresponding with the alphabetic order)

71022E: municipality part Stokrooie
 7 Province Limburg
 1 Arrondissement of Hasselt
 022 Merged municipality Hasselt
 E municipality part Stokrooie, which had the code 71056 before the merger.

External links 
 List of all NIS codes
 Wikidata list with NIS-codes

Encodings
Government of Belgium